The 1987 NFL season was the 68th regular season of the National Football League (NFL).  This season featured games predominantly played by replacement players, as the National Football League Players Association (NFLPA)  players were on strike from weeks four to six with week three being cancelled in its entirety. This remains the last NFL season in which regular-season games were impacted by a labor conflict (as well as the last season when non-union players were used as strike-breaking competitors).

The season ended with Super Bowl XXII, with the Washington Redskins defeating the Denver Broncos, 42–10, at Jack Murphy Stadium in San Diego. The Broncos suffered their second consecutive Super Bowl defeat.

Player movement

Transactions

Trades
On October 31, 1987, the Los Angeles Rams traded Eric Dickerson to the Indianapolis Colts in a three team trade involving the Buffalo Bills. The Rams sent Dickerson to the Colts for six draft choices and two players. Buffalo obtained the rights to Cornelius Bennett from Indianapolis. Buffalo sent running back Greg Bell and three draft choices to the Rams, while Indianapolis added Owen Gill and three of their own draft picks to complete the deal with the Rams.

Draft

The 1987 NFL Draft was held from April 28 to 29, 1987, at New York City's Marriott Marquis. With the first pick, the Tampa Bay Buccaneers selected quarterback Vinny Testaverde from the University of Miami.

Referee changes
Chuck Heberling retired during the 1987 off-season. He joined the NFL in 1965 as a line judge before being promoted to referee in 1972. Games that he officiated include the Hail Mary Game and The Drive. Fred Silva, who was a swing official in 1986, was given his own crew again.

Major rule changes
If a defensive player commits pass interference in his own end zone, the ball is placed at the 1-yard line, or if the previous spot was inside the 2-yard line, the penalty is half the distance to the goal line.
Except for the first onside kick attempt, if a kickoff goes out of bounds, the receiving team takes possession of the ball 30 yards from the spot of the kick or the spot it went out of bounds.
In order to stop the clock, the quarterback is permitted to throw the ball out of bounds or to the ground as long as he throws it immediately after receiving the snap.
During passing plays, an offensive player cannot chop block (block a defender below the thigh while the defensive player is already engaging another offensive player).
Illegal contact by a defensive player beyond the 5-yard zone from the line of scrimmage will not be called if the offensive team is in an obvious punt formation.
During kicks and punts, players on the receiving team cannot block below the waist. However, players on the kicking team may block below the waist, but only before the kick is made. On all other plays after a change of possession, no player can block below the waist.
Revenue sharing was changed so that NFL players received a portion of the ticket revenue, while the owners kept the revenue generated by skybox rentals. This led to many teams pushing for new stadiums which lowered many skybox suites from the less-desirable outer rim of a stadium to more desirable locations closer to the field (typically, the midsection or lower) so that the owners could charge more money for the suites, while similarly reducing the ticket revenue by replacing the higher-priced seats with lower-priced “nose bleed” seats. Overall, the number of available general admission seating was also reduced in favor of larger suites.

The NFLPA strike 
A 24-day players' strike was called after Week 2. The games that were scheduled for the third week of the season were cancelled, reducing the 16-game season to 15, but the games for Weeks 4, 5 and 6 were played with replacement players. The NFLPA actually ended the strike before the Week 6 slate of games, but the NFL owners' unanimously nixed their return that week because the union had missed an owner-mandated deadline that week to be eligible to return, and would have to wait until Week 7 to resume playing. Approximately 15% of the NFLPA’s players chose to cross picket lines to play during the strike; prominent players who did so included New York Jets defensive end Mark Gastineau, Dallas Cowboys defensive tackle Randy White, San Francisco 49ers quarterback Joe Montana, 49ers running back Roger Craig, New England Patriots quarterback Doug Flutie and Seattle Seahawks wide receiver Steve Largent. The replacement players were mostly those left out of work by the recent folding of the Canadian Football League’s Montreal Alouettes and the 1986 dissolution of the United States Football League, as well as others who had been preseason cuts, had long left professional football or were other assorted oddities (such as cinematographer Todd Schlopy, who, despite never playing professional football before or after the strike, served as placekicker for his hometown Buffalo Bills for three games). The replacement players, called to play on short notice and having little chance to gel as teammates, were widely treated with scorn by the press and general public, including name-calling, public shaming and accusations of being scabs. The games played by these replacement players were regarded with even less legitimacy – attendance plummeted to under 10,000 fans at many of the games in smaller markets and cities with strong union presence, including a low of 4,074 for the lone replacement game played in Philadelphia) — but nonetheless were counted as regular NFL games. Final television revenues were down by about 20%, a smaller drop than the networks had expected. The defending Super Bowl champion New York Giants went 0–3 in replacement games, ultimately costing them a chance to make the playoffs and to repeat their championship. The final replacement game was a Monday Night Football matchup on October 19, 1987, with the Washington Redskins at the Dallas Cowboys. Along with the Philadelphia Eagles, the Redskins were the only other NFL team not to have any players cross the picket line and were surprising 13–7 victors over the Cowboys who had plenty of big name players cross the picket line.

The 2017 film Year of the Scab, which aired as part of the ESPN series 30 for 30, documented the story of the replacement players who crossed the picket line to play for the Cowboys. A fictionalized account based on the 1987 strike formed the basis of the 2000 film The Replacements.

American Bowl
A series of National Football League pre-season exhibition games that were held at sites outside the United States, the only American Bowl game in 1987 was held at London’s Wembley Stadium.

Regular season

Scheduling formula

Highlights of the 1987 season included:
Thanksgiving: Two games were played on Thursday, November 26, featuring Kansas City at Detroit and Minnesota at Dallas, with Kansas City and Minnesota winning.

Final standings

Tiebreakers
Houston was the #4 seed in the AFC, winning a tiebreaker over Seattle based on better conference record (7–4 vs. Seahawks' 5–6).
Chicago was the #2 seed in the NFC, winning a tiebreaker over Washington based on better conference record (9–2 vs. Redskins' 9–3).
New England finished ahead of Miami in the AFC East based on head-to-head sweep (2–0).
Dallas finished ahead of St. Louis and Philadelphia in the NFC East based on better division record (4–4 to Cardinals' 3–5 and Eagles' 3–5), and St. Louis finished ahead of Philadelphia based on better conference record (7–7 to Eagles' 4–7).
Tampa Bay finished ahead of Detroit in the NFC Central based on better division record (3–4 to Lions' 2–5).

Playoffs

Awards
As awarded by the Associated Press

Coaching changes
Atlanta Falcons: Marion Campbell began his second stint as head coach of the Falcons, replacing the fired Dan Henning. Campbell previously coached the Falcons from the eighth game of 1974 through the seventh game of 1976, and was also coach of the Philadelphia Eagles from 1983 through the 15th game of 1985.
Buffalo Bills: Marv Levy began his first full season as the Bills' head coach. He was named as Hank Bullough's replacement after 9 games into the 1986 season.
Indianapolis Colts: Ron Meyer begin his first full season as the Colts' head coach. After Rod Dowhower was fired after the Colts lost their first 13 games in 1986, Meyer promptly led the team to three straight victories to finish 3–13.
Kansas City Chiefs: John Mackovic was fired and replaced by Frank Gansz.
San Diego Chargers: Al Saunders begin his first full season as the Chargers' head coach. He replaced Don Coryell, who left after a 1–7 start in 1986.
Tampa Bay Buccaneers: Leeman Bennett was fired and replaced by Alabama coach Ray Perkins, who previously coached the New York Giants from 1979-82.

Stadium changes 
The Miami Dolphins began playing at their new home, Joe Robbie Stadium, moving from the Miami Orange Bowl. This was also the Cardinals' final season at Busch Memorial Stadium in St. Louis; the team relocated to Tempe, Arizona, the following season.

Uniform changes
 The Buffalo Bills switched from blue face masks to white
 The Indianapolis Colts began wearing their white pants with their blue jerseys, discontinuing their gray pants
 The Miami Dolphins introduced a redesigned jersey to coincide with the opening of Joe Robbie Stadium. The stripes on the sleeves were pared down to make way for the helmet logo on the sleeves; TV numbers moved to the shoulders; and numbers changed to a new Dolphins-specific font.

Television changes 
The eight-year old ESPN cable network signed a three-year deal to become the first cable television broadcaster of the league, broadcasting a series of Sunday night games during the second half of the season. Its program ESPN Sunday Night NFL (subsequently rebranded as ESPN Sunday Night Football) debuted on November 8, 1987. The league also mandated that each ESPN game must air via broadcast syndication to an over-the-air station in the markets of the participating teams. ESPN also debuted NFL Primetime, featuring scores, highlights, and analysis of the Sunday afternoon games; the program served as a pregame show during those weeks of  Sunday Night Football.

In addition, ABC, CBS, and NBC each signed three-year contracts to renew their rights to broadcast Monday Night Football, the NFC package, and the AFC package, respectively.

ABC returned to a three-man booth, hiring Dan Dierdorf from CBS to join Al Michaels and Frank Gifford. ESPN's initial broadcast team consisted of Mike Patrick on play-by-play, with Roy Firestone and a weekly "guest color commentator". NFL Primetime included host Chris Berman, and analysts Tom Jackson and Pete Axthelm. NBC renamed its pregame show NFL Live! Gayle Sierens then made history as the first woman to do play-by-play for an NFL regular season game, calling NBC's telecast of the December 27 game between the Seattle Seahawks and the Kansas City Chiefs.

CBS fired "Jimmy the Greek" Snyder on January 16, 1988, a few days before the NFC Championship Game, after he made several questionable comments about African Americans during an interview with Ed Hotaling, producer-reporter for Washington, D.C. NBC station WRC-TV.

References
NFL Record and Fact Book
NFL History 1981–1990  (Last accessed December 4, 2005)
Total Football: The Official Encyclopedia of the National Football League

Footnotes

 
National Football League seasons